Russell Hughes was an American football coach.  He was the head football coach at  Morningside College in Sioux City, Iowa.  He held that position for the 1945 season.  His coaching record at Morningside 2–2–1.

Head coaching record

References

Possibly living people
Year of birth missing
Morningside Mustangs football coaches